Darian (also Romanized as Dārīān; also known as Dārlyān and Dārīūn) is a city in the Central District of Shiraz County, Fars Province, Iran.  At the 2006 census, its population was 9,926, in 2,558 families.

References

Populated places in Shiraz County

Cities in Fars Province